Sociedade Esportiva Ypiranga Futebol Clube, commonly known as Ypiranga, is a Brazilian football club based in Santa Cruz do Capibaribe, Pernambuco state. They competed twice in the Série C.

History
The club was founded on August 3, 1938. They competed in the Série C in 1995, when they were eliminated in the First Stage of the competition. Ypiranga won the Campeonato Pernambucano Second Level in 2004. The club competed again in the Série C in 2006, being eliminated again in the First Stage of the competition.

Achievements

 Campeonato Pernambucano Second Level:
 Winners (1): 2004

Stadium
Sociedade Esportiva Ypiranga Futebol Clube play their home games at Estádio Otávio Limeira Alves, nicknamed Limeirão. The stadium has a maximum capacity of 5,000 people.

References

Football clubs in Pernambuco
Association football clubs established in 1938
1938 establishments in Brazil